Blair Millar (born 16 October 1956), is a Scottish former footballer, who played for Clydebank, Airdrieonians and Kilmarnock.

External links

1956 births
Living people
Footballers from Paisley, Renfrewshire
Scottish footballers
Clydebank F.C. (1965) players
Airdrieonians F.C. (1878) players
Kilmarnock F.C. players
Scottish Football League players
Association football forwards